The 2020 Nigerian gubernatorial elections were held on 19 September 2020, in Edo State, and 10 October 2020, in Ondo State. The last regular gubernatorial elections for both states were in 2016. The All Progressives Congress' Rotimi Akeredolu was defending the Governor's office of Ondo while APC-turned-PDP Edo Governor Godwin Obaseki was defending his office. Both won reelection, leading to no net change in terms of overall party control of governorships.

Results summary

Notes

Edo 

One-term incumbent Godwin Obaseki switched from the APC to the PDP in 2020 and sought re-election under the PDP banner; Obaseki won the PDP nomination while former SSG and 2016 PDP gubernatorial nominee Osagie Ize-Iyamu became his main opponent by winning the APC nomination. Obaseki won re-election, 57–42.

Ondo 

One-term APC incumbent Rotimi Akeredolu sought re-election and won the APC nomination while former Ondo Attorney-General Eyitayo Jegede won the PDP nomination and Deputy Governor Agboola Ajayi won the ZLP nomination after losing the PDP primary. Akeredolu defeated Jegede and Ajayi, 51–34–12.

See also 
 2019 Nigerian general election
 2019 Nigerian gubernatorial elections

References 

2020
 
Gubernatorial elections
Gubernatorial elections